Osvald is a male given name.

People named Osvald include:
Kristian Osvald Viderø (1906–1991), Faroese clergyman, poet and Bible translator
Osvald Chlubna (1893–1971), Czech composer
Osvald Helmuth (1894–1966), Danish stage and film actor
Osvald Käpp (1905–1995), Estonian wrestler who won a gold medal at the 1928 Summer Olympics
Osvald Moberg (1888–1933), Swedish gymnast who competed in the 1908 Summer Olympics
Osvald Polívka (1859–1931), Austrian-born Czech architect associated with the Secession / Art Nouveau period in Prague
Osvald Sirén (1879–1966), Finnish-born Swedish art historian, whose interests included 18th century Sweden, Renaissance Italy and China

References

Czech masculine given names
Danish masculine given names
Estonian masculine given names
Swedish masculine given names
Masculine given names